Raduil Point  (‘Nos Raduil’ \'nos ra-du-'il\) is a point forming the northwest extremity of Astrolabe Island in Bransfield Strait off Trinity Peninsula, Antarctica.

The point is named after the settlement of Raduil in southwestern Bulgaria.

Location
German-British mapping in 1996.

Maps
 Trinity Peninsula. Scale 1:250000 topographic map No. 5697. Institut für Angewandte Geodäsie and British Antarctic Survey, 1996.
 Antarctic Digital Database (ADD). Scale 1:250000 topographic map of Antarctica. Scientific Committee on Antarctic Research (SCAR). Since 1993, regularly upgraded and updated.

References
 Raduil Point. SCAR Composite Gazetteer of Antarctica
 Bulgarian Antarctic Gazetteer. Antarctic Place-names Commission. (details in Bulgarian, basic data in English)

External links
 Raduil Point. Copernix satellite image

Headlands of Trinity Peninsula
Bulgaria and the Antarctic
Astrolabe Island

bg:Радуил (нос)